Kizh Kit’c  are the Mission Indians of San Gabriel, according to Andrew Salas, Smithsonian Institution,  Congress, the Catholic Church, the San Gabriel Mission,  and other Indigenous communities. Most California tribes were known by their community and geographic names (Cucamonga, Pimuvungna, Topanagna, etc.). 

"Kizh" is derived from a reference by a Canadian ethnologist to one of the numerous villages in the Los Angeles Basin from records at Mission Viejas, Kizheriños (The People of the Willow Houses). Hugo Reid documented at least 28 Gabrielino villages. In 1811, the priests of Mission San Gabriel recorded four Gabrieliňo languages, each with minor dialect differences; Kokomcar, Guiguitamcar, Corbonamga, and Sibanga. During this same period, at Mission San Fernando, three additional languages were recorded. 

More than a century later, in January 1982, the U.S. Corps of Engineers issued a report describing and identifying numerous Gabrieliňo villages.

Today the Kizh Nation is referred to as one of the descendant Gabrieleno tribes.

On October 10, 1994, the Kizh descendants were disenrolled from the original Gabrielino Tribal Council,  On December 9, 2010, they formed their non-profit as Los Indios de San Gabriel, Inc. According to Andrew Salas, Smithsonian Institution, Congress, the Catholic Church and other Indigenous communities, the Kizh Nation itself is based in San Gabriel, California and includes about 500 members. It is unclear the number of tribal members in the Fernandeno Tataviam Band of Mission Indians, Gabrieleno/Tongva San Gabriel Band of Mission Indians, Gabrielino/Tongva Nation, Gabrielino Tongva Indians of California Tribal Council, and Gabrielino-Tongva Tribe.

Name 
During colonization, the people were referred to as Gabrieleño and Fernandeño, names derived from the Spanish missions built on their land: Mission San Gabriel Arcángel and Mission San Fernando Rey de España. The name of Tongva  has been heavily criticized by the Kizh Nation, who see it as coming into existence in 1905 from the accounts of one ethnographer, C. Hart Merriam. Conversely, the Kizh claim that the name Kizh has origins in the earliest records of contact as a name the people used to refer to the willow branch, tule, and brush houses they lived in and was used widely by various ethnographers in the 19th and early 20th century. Tongva remains the most widely used name, gaining popularity in the late 20th century.

The word Tongva was coined by C. Hart Merriam in 1905 from a Gabrieleño woman named Mrs. James Rosemyre (née Narcisa Higuera), who lived around Fort Tejon, near Bakersfield. According to Ernie Salas, Merriam could not pronounce the village name Toviscangna, misinterpreted her response as a pan-tribal identifier, and abbreviated it as “tonve” or “tonvey” in his field notes; by his orthography, it would be pronounced , . Since tribal members referred to themselves primarily by their village name rather than a "national" or "pan-tribal" name. It is argued that Rosemyre was referring to her village name, not an overarching tribal name. From the perspective of the Kizh, Tongva was falsely promoted in the 1980s and 1990s until the point that it reached favorability. According to C. H. Merriam the term Kij (or Kizh) was a "term invented by [Robert Gordon] Latham for Indians of San Gabriel (based on numerals published by De Mofras)."

As stated by Kizh Nation (Gabrieleño Band of Mission Indians) tribal spokesperson Ernest Perez Teutimez Salas, Tongva gained notoriety in 1992 when the tribe was approached by non-Native people who expressed that in order to save a sacred spring in Santa Monica from a major development project and receive federal recognition that the tribe needed to use the name "Tongva." Although Salas had reservations about doing so and had never heard the term before, the tribe hesitantly supported the decision in order to save the spring, which was saved under the “Gabrieleño/Tongva Springs Foundation.” About a year later, contact with these individuals was cut off. As stated by Nadine Salas: "we used to have get-togethers, and then it was like they got what they wanted; they didn’t want anything to do with us anymore.” Kizh Nation biologist Matt Teutimez stated, "When you just throw it out into the universe, and it sticks, you go with it, and that’s what happened with the Tongva."

E. Gary Stickel observes that ethnologist John Peabody Harrington, who conducted extensive ethnographic work among the Southern California tribes, wrote in his notes (presently housed at the Smithsonian Institution archives) that the word tongva refers to where the Gabrieleño people ground their seeds on rocks, and that the noun must be accompanied by a positional prefix. Stickel writes that the term tongva has been used mistakenly to refer to the tribe "when, according to Harrington, it refers to what archaeologists call a 'bedrock mortar', which is a rock outcrop with depressions in it created by Indians pounding pestles into them to process acorns and other plant products."

Kizh 

According to Andrew Salas, the name Kizh (pronounced Keech), sometimes spelled Kij, comes from the first construction of Mission San Gabriel in 1771. The people of the surrounding villages who were used as slave laborers to construct the mission referred to themselves as "Kizh" and the Spanish hispanicized the term as "Kichireños," as noted by ethnographer J.P. Harrington's consultant Raimundo Yorba. The word Kizh referred to the houses they lived in, "most of which were dome-shaped and made with a framework of willow branches and roofed over with thatching." The neighboring ʔívil̃uqaletem (Cahuilla) referred to the people as Kisianos or "people of the willow-brush houses," which has been cited as a potential source for the term Kizh. Following the destruction of the original mission, the Spanish relocated the mission five miles north and began to refer to the Kizh as "Gabrieleño."...Kizh for the Indians living near San Gabriel (i.e. Whittier Narrows area)... According to Harrington's (ethnographer J.P. Harrington) consultant Raimundo Yorba, the Gabrielino in the Whittier Narrows area referred to themselves as Kichireno, one of a bunch of people that lived at that place of San Gabriel which is known as Mission Vieja. Kichereno is not a place name, but a tribe name, the name of a kind of people.In 1846, a Canadian scholar Horatio Hale used the term Kizh in a United States government report on “Ethnography and Philology.” Lieutenant Amiel Weeks Whipple, Thomas Ewbank, and William Turner used Kizh when publishing a “Report upon the Indian Tribes” in 1855 for the U.S. War Department. German scholar Johann Carl Eduard Buschmann used the term in a study on language in 1856 published in the German Royal Academy of Science. Further notable scholars who used Kizh throughout the 19th and early 20th centuries include George Bell (in 1856), Robert Gordon Latham (in 1860), Lewis H. Morgan (in 1868), Albert Samuel Gatschet (in 1877), Hubert Howe Bancroft (in 1883), Daniel G. Briton (in 1891), David Prescott Barrows (in 1900), and A. L. Kroeber (in 1907).

In 1875, H. C. Yarrow stated that the name Kizh could not be verified at Mission San Gabriel, though later reports contradict his statement. He reported that the natives called themselves Tobikhar meaning Settlers and spoke the Spanish language more than their own. In 1885, Hoffman also referred to the natives as Tobikhar. In 1900, David Prescott Barrows used the term Kizh and stated that use of the term Tobikhar was incorrect: "Mr. Gatschet is in error when he speaks of the Serrano and San Gabriel Indians calling themselves Takhtam and Tobikhar, respectively. The words are unknown as tribal designations among these Indians themselves, and precisely this point constitutes the objections to them.” It's important to remember that in 1811, the priests of Mission San Gabriel and Mission San Fernarndo recorded 7 languages. Each language is tantamount to a village name.

Gabrieleño 
The Act of September 21, 1968 introduced this concept of the affiliation of an applicant's ancestors in order to exclude certain individuals from receiving a share of the award to the “Indians of California” who chose to receive a share of any awards to certain tribes in California that had splintered off from the generic group. The members or ancestors of the petitioning group were not affected by the exclusion in the Act. Individuals with lineal or collateral descent from an Indian tribe who resided in California in 1852, would, if not excluded by the provisions of the Act of 1968, remain on the list of the “Indians of California.” To comply with the Act, the Secretary of Interior would have to collect information about the group affiliation of an applicant's Indian ancestors. That information would be used to identify applicants who could share in another award. The group affiliation of an applicant's ancestors was thus a basis for exclusion from, but not a requirement for inclusion on, the judgment roll. The act of 1968 stated that the Secretary of the Interior would distribute an equal share of the award to the individuals on the judgment roll “regardless of group affiliation."

Gabrieleño was the name assigned to the Indigenous peoples surrounding Mission San Gabriel by the Spanish. It was not a name that the people ever used to refer to themselves. However, it remains a part of every official tribe's name, either as "Gabrieleño" or "Gabrielino." Because of the disagreement between tribal groups surrounding usage of the term Tongva, Gabrieleño has been used as a mediating term. For example, when Debra Martin, a city council member from Pomona, led a project to dedicate wooden statues in local Ganesha Park to the Indigenous people of the area in 2017, there was considerable conflict over which name, Tongva or Kizh, would be used on the dedication plaque. A tentative agreement was reached to use the term Gabrieleño, despite its colonial origins.

See also 
 Mission Indians
 Tongva populated places
 Tongva

Notes

References

External links 
 Kizh Website

Tongva
California Mission Indians
Native American tribes in California
History of Los Angeles
History of Los Angeles County, California
History of Orange County, California
San Gabriel, California
Unrecognized tribes in the United States